Kandisha is a 2008 Moroccan horror film directed by Jerome Cohen-Olivar, starring Amira Casar, David Carradine, Michael Cohen, Saïd Taghmaoui, Mourad Zaoui, Hiam Abbass and Assaad Bouab.

Plot
A famous jinn fights lawyer Naila Al-Jaidi, who is attempting to find out how her daughter died.

Cast

Screening
Kandisha was first screened at the Marrakech International Film Festival in 2008.

References

External links

2000s Arabic-language films
2000s English-language films
2000s French-language films
2008 horror films
2008 films
2008 multilingual films
Moroccan multilingual films